This is a list of all seasons played by FK Partizani Tirana in national and European football, from 1947 to the most recent completed season.

This list details the club's achievements in all major competitions.

Seasons

 Partizani were relegated after a loss in the relegation play-off match against Kastrioti Krujë 0–1.
 Partizani were lost a championship final against Tërbuni Pukë 3–1, and therefore were placed at the second place in the league.

External links
 Official website
 Partizani Tirana at Soccerway.com
 List of Albanian champions at RSSSF.com
 Giovanni Armillota website

  
Partizani Tirana